Mireille Jouve (born 30 December 1960) is a French politician. She has served as a member of the French Senate since 28 September 2014. She is also the Mayor of Meyrargues.

References

1960 births
Living people
French Senators of the Fifth Republic
Women mayors of places in France
20th-century French women politicians
Women members of the Senate (France)
Senators of Bouches-du-Rhône